Bláhnjúkur is a volcano in the south of Iceland. Its height is 940 m.

Its name translates to blue peak in English. This comes from the blue-black colour of its sides. The colour is due to volcanic ash and lava flows.

The mountain is situated in Landmannalaugar, a natural park near Hekla. It lies next to the volcano Brennisteinsalda.

A hiking trail leads up to the top of the mountain from which, in good conditions, five glaciers are visible.

The best way to get to the peak is on road number F 208. The hike is considered easy and takes 1–2 hours round-trip.

See also
Geography of Iceland
Volcanism of Iceland

References

External links
  Photo, parts of the mountain in the middleground, on the right-hand side

Volcanoes of Iceland
Mountains of Iceland
East Volcanic Zone of Iceland